Range High School is an Afrikaans medium school in Matroosfontein, Western Cape, South Africa.

History 
Range High School was established in 1981 by the Apartheid government of South Africa specifically for staff and learners classified as coloreds. It is a public school that is administered by the Western Cape Education Department. The school opened with about 300 pupils in standard 6 and 7(today's equivalent to grade 8 and 9).

Past principals 
The inaugural principal was Mr. Wicomb. The other principals were:
 Mr. Botha
 Mr. Daniels
 Mr. L Liedeman
 Mr. L de Wet

Background 
The school, also known as Range Secondary School  is a government school that falls under the auspices of the Western Cape Education Department. With a learner enrollment of 359 in 2011, the school qualifies for a teaching staff of 13 educators including incumbent principal Mr. J Kayster.

Subjects in 2011 
 Afrikaans Home Language
 English First Additional Language
 Mathematical Literacy
 Mathematics
 Life Sciences
 Business Studies
 Computer Applications Technology
 Consumer Studies
 Geography
 History
 Life Orientation
 Tourism

References

External links 
 Western Cape Education Department

Afrikaner culture in Cape Town
Schools in the Western Cape
Schools in Cape Town
1981 establishments in South Africa
Afrikaans-language schools
High schools in South Africa